In algebraic geometry, the Ramanujam vanishing theorem is an extension of the Kodaira vanishing theorem due to , that in particular gives conditions for the vanishing of first cohomology groups of coherent sheaves on a surface. The Kawamata–Viehweg vanishing theorem generalizes it.

See also

Mumford vanishing theorem

References

Theorems in algebraic geometry